Oleg Brega (born October 26, 1973) is a Moldovan journalist, activist and filmmaker from Chişinău, the Republic of Moldova. He has been the president of the Moldovan public activism group Hyde Park since 2003. Oleg Brega hosts the show "Inamicul Public" (The public enemy), on Jurnal TV.

Oleg Brega worked for TeleRadio-Moldova (September 1, 1992 – September 15, 1995). He graduated from the Music, Theater and Fine Arts Academy, Chişinău (1996) and the Academy for Theater and Film in Bucharest (1999). In 2001, Brega began to host a nightly radio show called Hyde Park on Antena C; the Moldovan Ministry of the Interior soon intervened, and the program was shut down.

On March 10, 2008, Oleg Brega was assaulted by the Prime Minister's bodyguards in the hallway of the Moldova National Opera Ballet which hosted a meeting of Prime Minister Zinaida Greceanîi. In May 2008, Oleg Brega was arrested for peacefully protesting in front of the National Palace where a celebration was held to mark the 50th anniversary of the foundation of Moldova 1. The Buiucani District Court ruled that his placard, which bore the inscription "50 Years of Lies", constituted "injury" and sentenced him to three days' detention.

His group Hyde Park, founded in 2003 after his radio show of the same name was shut down, helped organise 2009 Moldova civil unrest. On April 9, 2009, Amnesty International wrote that "Oleg Brega, Ghenadie Brega and Natalia Morari are currently in hiding for fear of being arrested."

References

External links 
 VIP Magazin, Brega Oleg
 VIP Magazin, Cine sunt şi ce vor fraţii Brega? 
 Radio Free Europe, For One Moldovan Activist, 'We Are Freer, Because We Have Nothing To Lose' 
 Protests hijacked by "drug users and hooligans" 
 Moldovan journalist Oleg Brega remarks for Helsinki Commission new media briefing
 „Eu sunt inamicul public” 
 CASE OF HYDE PARK AND OTHERS v. MOLDOVA (no. 2) 
 Natalia Morari şi Oleg Brega, liderii informali ai tinerilor revoluţionari din Chişinău?

1973 births
People from Sîngerei District
Living people
Moldovan activists
Moldovan journalists
Male journalists